Beatrice I (French: Béatrix Ire de Bigorre; c. 1064 – after 14 October 1095) was a sovereign Countess of Bigorre from 1080 until 1095.

Life
Her mother was called Étiennette, whilst her father was Bernard II of Bigorre. She also had a half-sister Clemence.

In 1077, Lady Beatrice married Centule V, Viscount of Béarn.

In 1080 Beatrice became Countess, a successor of her brother, Count Raymond of Bigorre. As was the custom when a woman inherited a domain at that period, her spouse became her co-ruler. 

Beatrice, with the help of Centule V, donated to some monasteries.

Issue 
Bernard III of Bigorre 
Centule II, Count of Bigorre.

Notes 
 
11th-century women rulers
Counts of Bigorre